The Silent Revolution, lit. "The Silent Classroom") is a 2018 German drama film directed by Lars Kraume. The film tells the story of a high school class in the communist German Democratic Republic, who have a moment of silence in their classroom for the victims of the failed anti-communist Hungarian Revolution of 1956. This small act of solidarity has unforeseen consequences, impacting the children, their parents and the school board. The film is based on a true story told in a book of the same name by Dietrich Garstka (1939–2018), one of the students.

Plot 
In late 1956, prior to 1961 construction of the Berlin Wall, East German (GDR) high school students Kurt and Theo secretly go to the cinema in West Berlin. They watch a newsreel and learn of the anti-communist Hungarian uprising. Back home in Stalinstadt, they convince some class members to visit the nearby home of Edgar, the great-uncle of one of the students, Paul. At Edgar's, the students listen to the radio station RIAS, broadcasting from West Berlin. While listening, they learn of the death of Ferenc Puskás, a Hungarian footballer adored by the students, which ultimately turns out to be misinformation, possibly intended to infuriate the protesters. Kurt manages to convince the majority of the class to hold a moment of silence for the victims in Hungary before class starts. This upsets their teacher, and student Erik tells him it is an act of protest. After once again meeting at Edgar's, the class takes a vote and decides to lie about what happened, and to say it was a moment of mourning for footballer Puskás.

Kessler, a zealous school superintendent, begins to look into the incident. Fritz Lange, the minister for national education in the GDR, arrives at the school and classifies the incident as counter-revolutionary and asks the class to point to the instigator. The entire class stays silent, and as punishment they are all prohibited from graduating. Under pressure, Erik confesses the entire story about Edgar and listening to RIAS. Edgar is then arrested, with Paul witnessing the arrest. Theo's father tries to reason with Lange, but he is not taken seriously due to his involvement with the East German uprising of 1953.

The next day, Kessler interrogates every member of the class. To up the pressure on Erik, she tells Erik that his father, whom he reveres as a socialist hero, was actually a Nazi collaborator who was then hanged by the Red Army. Erik cannot deal with this, gives up Kurt, and shoots his firearm instructor. After threatening his mother, he is overpowered by three of his classmates. He then confesses to having given up Kurt. That evening, Kessler tries to convince Kurt to put the blame on Erik. Kurt refuses and flees to West Berlin. The next day, Kessler asks every class member to confirm that Kurt was indeed the instigator of the moment of silence, to which the class refuses. Following their refusal they are all expelled, and within a few days they collectively flee to West Berlin.

Cast

References

External links 

2018 drama films
German drama films
Films set in schools
Cold War films
Films critical of communism
Films set in 1956
Films set in East Germany
2010s German-language films
2010s German films